U.S. Highway 82 (US 82) in Arkansas is a major east–west arterial highway across the state's lowest tier of counties.  It enters Arkansas from Texas, concurrent with US Highway 67, at a junction with US Highway 71 on the border between Texarkana, Texas and Texarkana, Arkansas. The route leaves Arkansas on the Lake Village Bridge over the Mississippi River near Lake Village, crossing into Mississippi.

Route description
US 82 runs across the southern tier of counties in Arkansas, serving three cities of regional importance: Texarkana, Magnolia, and El Dorado in the Arkansas Timberlands. The eastern half of the route runs through the Lower Arkansas Delta, serving small towns and agricultural areas.

US 82 enters the state from Texarkana, TX concurrent with US 67 as a pair of one-way streets. Running east as 7th Street (the westbound half of the couplet is Dr. Martin Luther King Jr. Blvd), the road enters Arkansas at an intersection with State Line Avenue. The junction provides US 67/ US 82 with access northward to US 59/US 71 via US 71Y (unsigned). At Hazel Street, US 67/US 82 intersects US 59/US 71, beginning a brief concurrency east to Hickory St, when US 59/US 71 turns south toward Shreveport, LA. The intersection is near the J.K. Wadley House, listed on the National Register of Historic Places. The two one-way streets combine at Hickory St and run east as 9th Street to Broad Street, where US 67 turns northeast. Continuing east, US 82 intersects Interstate 49 (I-49) with a diamond interchange, the only junction with an Interstate highway in Arkansas. In east Texarkana, US 82 intersects Highway 237 south of the Texarkana Regional Airport.

East of Texarkana, US 82 runs to the east side of Miller County near the Lafayette County line and Red River. The route intersects Highway 296 before turning south toward Garland, where it intersects Highway 134. US 82 turns east and crosses the Red River to enter Lafayette County. US 82 runs east to Lewisville, the county seat of Lafayettte County, where it intersects Highway 29 just south of downtown Lewisville. The route continues east to Stamps, where a concurrency begins with Highway 53 to Buckner, where Highway 53 turns north. East of Buckley, the highway crosses into Columbia County, with the county line following Dorcheat Bayou.

After passing over Dorcheat Bayou, US 82 serves as the northern terminus of Highway 344 near Lake Columbia. Continuing east to Lumber, US 82 intersects Highway 98 and turns southeast toward Magnolia. Highway 98 in this area is a former alignment of US 82, which formerly ran through Waldo and McNeil. US 82 intersects US 371 near the northwest corner of Magnolia; giving access to downtown Magnolia. US 82 serves as the northern boundary for Magnolia and Southern Arkansas University (SAU), including Walker Stadium at Goodheart Field, the football stadium. US 82 serves as the northern terminus of Highway 355 (Washington Street), which serves as the main road through campus. On the eastern side of the city, US 82 intersects and overlaps US 79 for  until a junction with US 82B (Main Street). US 82B runs west toward downtown Magnolia, US 79 continues south to Haynesville, Louisiana, and US 82 turns east as a section line road toward El Dorado.

Entering Union County, US 82 serves as the southern terminus of Highway 57 at Marysville and Highway 172 at Cairo before passing the South Arkansas Regional Airport. Shortly after entering the city limits of El Dorado, US 82 veers right onto an divided highway, with a former alignment continuing toward the central business district as a business route. Along the city's southwest side, US 82 serves as a northern terminus of Highway 15 at exit 18. In the city's southeast corner, an interchange with US 167, US 63, and Highway 7 gives access to Camden, Hampton, and Bernice, LA. US 82 reconnects with the business route and runs east to Strong, where it has a junction with Highway 275 and Highway 129. East of Strong, US 82 enters the Felsenthal National Wildlife Refuge, passing north of Lake Jack Lee to cross the Ouachita River and enter Ashley County. 

Highway 82 serves as the northern terminus of Highway 82 Spur, leading to the Port of Crossett, before the route exits the NWR. Entering Crossett, the route has an overlap with Highway 169 and passes a Georgia Pacific plant. North of downtown, Highway 82 intersects Highway 133 Truck, followed by a short overlap with Highway 133. The highway exits the town heading due east, turns north and begins an overlap with Highway 52 and US 425. Shortly after turning north, Highway 52 breaks from the concurrency toward the west, with US 82/US 425 continuing north to Hamburg. Upon entering the city, US 82/US 425 begins overlaps with Highway 52, passing the First United Methodist Church and Hamburg Commercial Historic District. North of downtown, US 82 turns east onto St. Louis Street, with US 425 and Highway 8 continuing north on Main Street. The route runs northeast to Thebes, where it has a junction with Highway 160 before bypassing Montrose, where US 82B serves the downtown business district. US 82 has a grade-separated intersection with US 165 in Montrose before continuing east into Chicot County.

The route continues east to Lake Village; from there across the Mississippi River to Greenville, MS.

History
The route was designated on July 1, 1931. In Arkansas, it replaced State Road 2.

US 82 was realigned around Waldo and Magnolia on February 25, 1954 on to present-day US 371. The former alignment of US 82 was redesignated at Highway 98. On May 20, 1970, this segment was bypassed by a new terrain US 82. The former routings were renumbered Highway 98 and Highway 19 (now US 371), and the Magnolia business route was created.

 El Dorado was bypassed in the 1980s; Highway 2 is now a business route.
 The segment between Crossett and Hamburg has been rerouted several times, most recently in the 1970s. Highway 2 is now parts of Highway 133 and Highway 52 north of Crossett, a short spur of Highway 189 in Hamburg, and a county road from the end of Highway 189 south to Highway 52.
 Montrose was bypassed in the 1940s by a railroad overpass; Highway 2 is now a minor business route.

In 1989, the Arkansas General Assembly passed Act 622. This act authorized governor Bill Clinton to sign a compact with Texas, Mississippi, and Alabama to four-lane US 82 across the four states. The compact also created the U.S. Highway 82 Four Lane Construction Authority to assist the effort. Mike Kinard, state senator from Magnolia, sponsored the bill. Mississippi joined the effort in 1989, appointing three citizens to the Authority. However, it appears the Authority was never created; with Texas, Alabama, and United States Congress coordination and approval never coming to pass.

Major intersections

See also
 Red River Bridge (Arkansas) – Former bridge carrying US 82

Notes

References

External links

 

 Arkansas
82
Transportation in Ashley County, Arkansas
Transportation in Chicot County, Arkansas
Transportation in Columbia County, Arkansas
Transportation in Lafayette County, Arkansas
Transportation in Miller County, Arkansas
Transportation in Union County, Arkansas